Hugg-Thomas Wildlife Management Area is a Wildlife Management Area in Howard County, Maryland, south of the town of Sykesville. The area comprises two parcels totaling . The Carroll County portion includes the estate of Admiral Jacob Hugg, including the ruins of the Hugg mansion.

References

External links

 Hugg-Thomas Wildlife Management Area

Wildlife management areas of Maryland
Protected areas of Carroll County, Maryland
Protected areas of Howard County, Maryland